"Speed Your Love to Me" is a song by Simple Minds, which was released as the second single from the album Sparkle in the Rain on 9 January 1984. It quickly reached number 20 in the UK Singles Chart, and remained in the charts for 4 weeks.
 The song was used as the ending theme to the Australian music program, rage.

Style 
Much like its predecessor in the charts, "Waterfront", "Speed Your Love to Me" was a stadium-oriented rock song with heavy drums and the keyboards playing a more subtle role. Dave Thompson of Allmusic describes the song as "arena rock" with the keyboards "bubbling through the crash and clash" of the drums and guitars rather than guiding the song from the forefront.

Music video 

A promotional video was completed for the single on 6 December 1983, which was a cinematic composition of studio performances and scenic images. The fan website Dream Giver Redux describes how fast-moving clips of moving through roads and tunnels in urban Glasgow coincides with the chorus "Run till we come, until we be/Speed your love to me". These projections of the Clyde Tunnel, Kingston Bridge and Erskine Bridge expand into aerial perspectives of the Firth of Clyde and Loch Lomond as Jim Kerr sings "higher and higher" while the camera 'takes off'. Clips of the band performing in a studio connect these narratives together.

Track listing

7" single 
 Virgin VS 649
 "Speed Your Love to Me" – 3:59
 "Bass Line" – 4:35

12" single 
 Virgin VS 649-12
 "Speed Your Love to Me" (Extended Mix) – 7:29
 "Speed Your Love to Me" – 3:59
 "Bass Line" – 4:35

The album version of the song is slightly longer, at 4:25. "Bass Line" is an instrumental version of "White Hot Day", the seventh song of Sparkle in the Rain.

References 

1984 singles
Simple Minds songs
Song recordings produced by Steve Lillywhite
1984 songs
Virgin Records singles
Songs written by Jim Kerr
Songs written by Derek Forbes
Songs written by Charlie Burchill
Songs written by Mick MacNeil
Music television series theme songs